Helene Delmee (born 16 May 1987, Ottignies-Louvain-La-Neuve, Belgium) is a Belgian field hockey player. At the 2012 Summer Olympics she competed with the Belgium women's national field hockey team in the women's tournament.

References

External links 
 

Living people
1987 births
Field hockey players at the 2012 Summer Olympics
Olympic field hockey players of Belgium
Belgian female field hockey players
People from Ottignies-Louvain-la-Neuve
Sportspeople from Walloon Brabant